Rud Ab-e Sharqi Rural District is a rural district (dehestan) in Rud Ab District, Narmashir County, Kerman Province, Iran. At the 2006 census, its population was 12,059, in 2,987 families. The rural district has 23 villages.

References 

Rural Districts of Kerman Province
Narmashir County